Modo is a district (kecamatan) in Lamongan Regency, East Java Province, Indonesia.

References

External links
 

Districts of East Java